The discography of American pop punk band The Ataris consists of five studio albums, one live album, one video album, six extended plays, seven singles, two promotional singles and seven music videos.

Albums

Studio albums

Compilation albums

Live albums

Video albums

Extended plays

Singles

Promotional singles

Compilation appearances

Music videos

References

External links
 Official website
 The Ataris at AllMusic
 

Pop punk group discographies
Discographies of American artists